Borkowski (feminine: Borkowska; plural: Borkowscy) or Borkowsky is a surname of Polish-language origin. The surname may refer to:

 Alfons Dunin-Borkowski (1870–1938), Polish painter
 Amy Borkowsky, American author and comedian
 Anna Borkowska (disambiguation), multiple people
 Ansley B. Borkowski (1898–1992), New York politician
 Bob Borkowski (born 1926), American baseball player
 Dave Borkowski (born 1977), American baseball player
 Dennis Borkowski (born 2002), German footballer 
 Frank Borkowski, German judoka
 Ingo Borkowski (born 1971), German sailor
 Mark Borkowski (born 1959), British public relations agent and writer
 Mateusz Borkowski (born 1997), Polish athlete
 Mike Borkowski (born 1973), American racing driver
 Rainer Borkowsky (born 1942), German rower 
 Rafal E. Dunin-Borkowski (born 1969), British physicist
 Shek Borkowski (born 1963), Polish football manager
 Tomasz Borkowski (born 1972), Polish football manager

See also
 
 

Polish-language surnames